Orlando "Puntilla" Ríos (December 26, 1947 – August 12, 2008) was a percussionist/vocalist well known in Cuba and the Americas as a master of the many Cuban musical folkloric forms. Born in Havana, Puntilla came to U.S. in 1981 with the Mariel boatlift, quickly changing the batá scene in New York single-handedly, becoming the new influence for American bataleros. When 'Puntilla' arrived in New York, he brought with him a wealth of knowledge of the profound folkloric music unique to Cuba and became a teacher and mentor to many. Ríos was also the foundation of the religious community in New York, providing and guiding the music at ceremonies and celebrations throughout the tri-state area. He performed with great musicians from the worlds of both Latin music and jazz throughout the United States, South America, Europe, and Japan.

Filmography

References

External links
Discography at Smithsonian Folkways Recordings
Listing of all Puntilla Recordings 

1947 births
2008 deaths
Rumba singers
Batá drummers
Musicians from Havana
Cuban percussionists
20th-century Cuban male singers